is a Japanese manga drawn by Jirō Tsunoda and Jōya Kagemaru, with the story written by Ikki Kajiwara. The story was inspired by the life of the real-life karate martial artist Mas Oyama.

The manga was published in Weekly Shōnen Magazine between 1971 and 1977, and accumulated in 29 tankōbon volumes. It was adapted into an anime television series from 1973 to 1974, and a live-action film in 1977.

Anime and film adaptations 
The anime television series was produced by Tokyo Movie and aired Wednesdays, from 19:30 to 20:00, on NET from October 3, 1973 to September 25, 1974, totaling 47 episodes.

The manga was first adapted into a live-action film by Toei as Karate Baka Ichidai, which was released on 14 May 1977 (the English release title was Karate for Life). It was directed by Kazuhiko Yamaguchi and starred Shin'ichi ("Sonny") Chiba. The two-part film, Shin Karate Baka Ichidai: Kakutōsha, which was directed by Takeshi Miyasaka and released in 2003 and 2004 to commemorate the seventeenth anniversary of Kajiwara's death, is often treated as an adaptation of the manga, but its direct source is a book by Hisao Maki, Kajiwara's younger brother.

The anime is now available on Hulu (in the U.S.) under the name Karate Master. Discotek Media has licensed the anime for home video release in North America.

Reception and legacy 
The success of the manga and the anime are often credited for producing a "karate boom" in Japan in the early 1970s.

Video game artist Keiji Inafune drew inspiration from Karate Master for several character designs in the arcade fighting game Street Fighter (1987).

References

External links 
 Karate Master on TMS Entertainment's website
 Karate Baka Ichidai on TMS Entertainment's website 
 
 

1971 manga
1973 anime television series debuts
1974 Japanese television series endings
Anime series based on manga
Discotek Media
Fuji TV original programming
Japanese television series with live action and animation
Karate in anime and manga
Kodansha manga
Live-action films based on manga
Manga adapted into films
Shōnen manga
TMS Entertainment